Morgan Hen ab Owain or Morgan the Old (died 974), first known as Morgan ab Owain of Gwent and also known as Moragn Hen Fawr, was the king of Morgannwg. He ruled from AD 942 to 974.

In 931, Morgan was one of the Welsh rulers who submitted to Athelstan's overlordship, and attended him at court in Hereford.

Morgan united the former kingdoms of Gwent and Glywysing in 942 under the name of Morgannwg, but they were broken up again immediately after his death, remaining separate until about 1055

References

Sources

974 deaths
Year of birth unknown
Monarchs of Morgannwg
Monarchs of Glywysing